Karachi Time (abbreviated as KART, LMT or Local Mean Time) was a time zone set at UTC+04:28:12 ahead of Greenwich Mean Time and observed prior until 1907 in Karachi. The local time was established by the Karachi Chamber of Commerce & Industry. From 1951 to 1971, the term Karachi Time was again used to denote UTC+05:00 for West Pakistan abbreviated as KART as opposed to Dacca Time (DACT) used in East Pakistan.

See also
 Pakistan Standard Time
 Time in Pakistan

References

History of Karachi
Time zones
Time in Pakistan
1842 establishments in British India